Kožíšek (feminine: Kožíšková) is a Czech surname. Notable people with the surname include:

 Čestmír Kožíšek (born 1991), Czech ski jumper
 Dušan Kožíšek (born 1983), Czech skier
 Karel Kožíšek (born 1977), Czech canoeist

See also
 

Czech-language surnames